The fourteenth season of the American reality The Voice premiered on February 26, 2018, on NBC. Adam Levine and Blake Shelton returned for their fourteenth season as coaches. Meanwhile, Alicia Keys returned for her third season after a one-season hiatus replacing Jennifer Hudson, alongside new coach Kelly Clarkson replacing Miley Cyrus.

This season featured two new elements: the Block, added during the Blind Auditions, allows the coaches to block one coach from getting an artist the coach turned around for. The Save, added during the Knockouts, allowed a coach to save an artist from elimination; However, if another coach also pressed his or her Steal button, the contestant could then decide whether they wanted to go to a new team or stay with their coach.

On May 22, 2018, Brynn Cartelli was crowned the winner of The Voice. At age 15, Cartelli became the youngest winner in the show's history surpassing Sawyer Fredericks and Danielle Bradbery at 16; Clarkson became the first new coach to win on her first attempt and the third female coach to win a season (being Alicia Keys and Christina Aguilera). Additionally, runner-up Britton Buchanan became the highest-placing artist who advanced via an Instant Save, following Joshua Davis of season eight and Chris Jamison of season seven, who both placed third.

The fourteenth season was also notable when Levine selected Angel Bonilla, the first transgender contestant to turn a chair in the American version.

Coaches and hosts 

The coaching lineup changed once again for the fourteenth season. Adam Levine and Blake Shelton returned as coaches, making them the only members of the coaching panel to be part of all fourteen seasons. Miley Cyrus and Jennifer Hudson did not return and were replaced by new coach Kelly Clarkson, who was Team Blake's battle advisor in the second season and key advisor for the Knockout Rounds in thirteenth season, and Alicia Keys who returned to the panel after a one season absence and participating in her third season as coach, Carson Daly returned for his fourteenth season as host.

This season's advisors for the Battle Rounds were Julia Michaels for Team Adam, Shawn Mendes for Team Alicia, Hailee Steinfeld for Team Kelly, and Trace Adkins for Team Blake.

The coaches perform a medley set in vintage Las Vegas in the promo. Adam Levine and Blake Shelton duet on "Fly Me to the Moon", Kelly Clarkson and Alicia Keys perform an amazing version of "Feeling Good".

· Notes: At nineteen, Shawn Mendes became the youngest advisor on the American version of this show's history.

Teams
Color key

Blind auditions
A new feature within the Blind Auditions this season is the Block, which each coach can use once to prevent one of the other coaches from getting a contestant.

Episode 1 (February 26)

Episode 2 (February 27)

Episode 3 (March 5)

Episode 4 (March 6)

Episode 5 (March 12)

Episode 6 (March 13)

The Battles
The Battle Rounds started on March 19. Season fourteen's advisors include: Julia Michaels for Team Adam, Shawn Mendes for Team Alicia, Hailee Steinfeld for Team Kelly, and Trace Adkins for Team Blake. The coaches can steal two losing artists from other coaches.

Color key:

 Alexa Cappelli was paired with Hannah Goebel for the battles, but due to personal reasons, Goebel withdrew. Therefore, Cappelli performed by herself and moved on by default.

The Knockouts
The Knockouts round started on April 2. The coaches can each steal one losing artist from another team and save one artist who lost their Knockout on their own team. The top 24 contestants then moved on to the Live Playoffs.

For the first time ever in The Voice history, recent winners of the show returned as Key Advisors — Jordan Smith for Team Adam, Chris Blue for Team Alicia, Cassadee Pope for Team Kelly, and Chloe Kohanski for Team Blake.

Color key:

Live Shows
Color key:

Week 1: Live Playoffs (April 16, 17, and 18)
For the first time, the Live Playoffs were split into two rounds and introduced immunity to the highest vote-getters to advance to the Top 12 in Round 1.

Round 1
During the first round of the Live Playoffs, the Top 24 performed for the votes of the public. The artist with the highest number of votes on each team directly advanced to the Top 12, exempting from performing (and immune from elimination in) round 2.

Color key:

Round 2
For Tuesday and Wednesday nights, the 20 remaining artists performed a second time for the votes of the public (separate from the previous round's votes). The artist with the highest number of votes on each team advances, and a third decided by the coach itself.

Color key:

Week 2: Top 12 (April 23–24)
This week's theme was “Story Behind The Song”. The two artists with the fewest votes competed for an Instant Save, with one artist eliminated from the competition. No artists received the iTunes vote multiplier this week as none of the singles reached the Top 10 iTunes.

Week 3: Top 11 (April 30, May 1)
The theme for this week was "Fan Night", meaning that the artists performed songs chosen by the fans.

iTunes bonuses were awarded to Pryor Baird (#4) and Britton Buchanan (#6).

Week 4: Top 10 (May 7–8)
The theme for this week was “Overcoming Struggles”. This week featured double elimination and a bottom three facing Instant Save.

iTunes bonuses were awarded to Kyla Jade (#5), Brynn Cartelli (#8), Buchanan (#9), and Baird (#10).

Week 5: Semifinals (May 14–15)
The Top 8 performed on Monday, May 14, 2018, with the results following on Tuesday, May 15, 2018. This week's theme is "Duet Medley Songs". In the semifinals, three artists automatically moved on to next week's finale, the two artists with the fewest votes were immediately eliminated and the middle three contended for the remaining spot in next week's finale via the Instant Save. iTunes bonuses were awarded to Jade (#2), Buchanan (#3), Cartelli (#4), Kaleb Lee (#5), Baird (#7) and Spensha Baker (#10). In addition to their individual songs, each artist performed a duet with another artist in the competition, though these duets were not available for purchase on iTunes.

With the elimination of Rayshun LaMarr, Levine no longer had any artists remaining on his team, making it the first time since the fourth season (and the third time overall, with the first time being the third season)) in which none of his artists represented him in the finale. With the advancement of Cartelli to the finale, Clarkson became the third new coach to successfully get an artist on their team to the finale on their first attempt as a coach, the second being Alicia Keys, who coached Wé McDonald all the way to the finale of the eleventh season, and the first being Usher, who coached Michelle Chamuel all the way to the finale of the fourth season. This also marked the first time ever that two female coaches were represented in the finale, with Cartelli representing Clarkson, and Buchanan representing Keys.

Week 6: Finale (May 21–22)
The Final 4 performed on Monday, May 21, 2018, with the final results following on Tuesday, May 22, 2018. Finalists performed a solo cover song, a duet with their coach, and an original song. iTunes bonuses were awarded to Buchanan (#1 and #10), Cartelli (#3 and #6), Baker (#4) and Jade (#9). Buchanan's "Where You Come From" and Cartelli's "Walk My Way" are the only songs that charted #1 on iTunes.

This is the first time that an artist who won the Instant Save in the semifinals didn't finish in the bottom two in the finals, with Buchanan finishing second.  With Buchanan and Cartelli making it to the Top 2, this marked the first time in which the final results came down to two artists who have neither represented Shelton nor Levine, but two female coaches (Buchanan representing Alicia Keys, and Cartelli representing Kelly Clarkson), as well as the two coaches in the "middle chairs."

Elimination chart

Color key 
Artist's info

Results details

Overall

Teams

Ratings

References

External links

Season 14
2018 American television seasons